Me Musical Nephews is a 1942 one-reel animated cartoon directed by Seymour Kneitel and animated by Tom Johnson and George Germanetti. Jack Mercer and Jack Ward wrote the script. It is the 113th episode of the Popeye series, which was released on December 25, 1942.

Plot 
One night, the nephews are practicing playing their music while Popeye is continually falling asleep. He tells them to get ready for bed so he can tell them a story. The nephews are unhappy with the short story but are sent to bed anyway. The nephews are not so tired and eventually start playing music with various objects (such as mattress springs, suspenders, medicine bottles, etc.), and Popeye eventually hears the racket and destroys the radio trying to find what's causing the noise. He soon finds out it is coming from the nephews and tries to catch them in the act. He fails however and tries to fall asleep anyway. He goes crazy and jumps out of the screen, leaving the film to end with the music playing.

Production notes 
Me Musical Nephews was remade in color as Riot in Rhythm in 1950. There were a few differences made for these cartoons; for example, an uncredited Sammy Timberg composed the music for Me Musical Nephews, while the music for Riot in Rhythm was by Winston Sharples. There is also no mention of Swee'Pea.

Me Musical Nephews is in the public domain in the United States, as the copyright was not renewed.

References

External links 

1942 short films
1942 animated films
1940s American animated films
American comedy short films
American black-and-white films
Popeye the Sailor theatrical cartoons
Paramount Pictures short films
1942 musical films
American musical films
American animated short films
1940s English-language films
Animated films about children